Fond-du-Lac Airport  is located  north of Fond-du-Lac, Saskatchewan, Canada.

Accidents 
The West Wind Aviation Flight 280, an ATR-42 aircraft crashed with 22 passengers and three crew members on board at Fond-du-Lac, approximately 1 km from the airport, immediately after taking off from the airport, on December 13, 2017. The aircraft was destroyed but everyone on board initially survived, although some had serious injuries. One passenger, Arsen Fern Jr., died of his injuries two weeks after the accident.

See also 
List of airports in Saskatchewan

References

External links

Certified airports in Saskatchewan